Dave Mohammad (born 8 October 1979) is a  former West Indian cricketer. He is a slow left-arm wrist-spin bowler, and bats left-handed.

Having played only three first-class matches for Trinidad and Tobago, Mohammad was called up to the West Indies squad for the third Test against South Africa in March 2001, but did not make his Test debut until January 2004, again against South Africa. After one further Test against England Mohammad lost the spinner's position to Omari Banks.

Following a productive domestic season in 2006, Mohammad was recalled firstly to the West Indies One Day International (ODI) side, and subsequently to the Test side, for the series against India. A match-winning performance in the final ODI was followed by a half century in the first Test at Antigua, which led to the West Indies hanging on for a draw with one wicket remaining.  He played in a subsequent series against Pakistan, where he impressed with his lower-order batting.

1979 births
Living people
Trinidad and Tobago cricketers
West Indies Test cricketers
West Indies One Day International cricketers
Antigua Hawksbills cricketers